An anaxonic neuron is a type of neuron where there is no axon or it cannot be differentiated from the dendrites. Being loyal to the etymology of anaxonic there are two types of anaxonic neurons in the human nervous system, the undifferentiated anaxonic neuron where the axon cannot be differentiated from the dendrites, and the unipolar brush cell (UBC), that has no axon and only a dendritic arbour.

Location
They are found in the brain and retina, in the latter location it is found as the amacrine cell and retina horizontal cells. They are also found in invertebrates.

Function
They act as non-spiking interneurons.

See also
Interneuron
Unipolar neuron
Pseudounipolar neuron
Bipolar neuron
Multipolar neuron

References

Neurons